Tyrell Nate Terry (born September 28, 2000) is an American former professional basketball player. He played college basketball for the Stanford Cardinal.

Terry was selected 31st overall in the 2020 NBA draft by the Dallas Mavericks. He spent one season with the team before he was waived. Terry also played for the Memphis Grizzlies from December 2021 to July 2022. He retired from professional basketball in December 2022.

Early life and high school career
Terry was born in Valley City, North Dakota, to Carrie Grise, and he moved with his mother to Minneapolis when he was five years old. He played basketball for DeLaSalle High School. As a freshman, he helped his team win the Class 3A state championship to become the first team in Minnesota to win five straight titles. He also led DeLaSalle to 3A state titles as a sophomore and senior. As a junior, Columbia Heights High School ended DeLaSalle's streak of state titles in the semi-finals. In his senior season, Terry was named a finalist for the Minnesota Mr. Basketball award. He scored 22 points in the 2019 title game.

College career
On November 6, 2019, Terry made his debut for Stanford, recording 14 points, four rebounds and four assists in a 73–62 win over Montana. On November 21, he registered his first career double-double with 21 points and 10 rebounds in an 81–50 victory over William & Mary. In his next game, Terry had another double-double, posting 20 points and 11 rebounds in a 73–54 win over Oklahoma. On January 13, 2020, he was named Pac-12 Conference Freshman of the Week after averaging 16.5 points, 7.5 rebounds and 4.5 assists per game in wins over Washington and Washington State. On February 26, Terry scored a career-high 27 points with seven three-pointers to lead his team past Utah, 70–62. This performance, along with a 12-point effort to upset 21st-ranked Colorado, helped him earn Pac-12 Freshman of the Week honors on March 2. At the end of the regular season, Terry was named to the Pac-12 All-Freshman Team and All-Pac-12 honorable mention. As a freshman, he averaged 14.7 points, 4.5 rebounds, 3.2 assists and 1.4 steals per game. His shooting accuracy, with a 40.8 three-point percentage and team-high 89.1 free throw percentage, helped him gain attention as a National Basketball Association (NBA) prospect. Following the season, Terry declared for the 2020 NBA draft. On July 31, Terry announced he was remaining in the draft.

Professional career
It was reported that Terry broke a record for a basketball IQ test administered by several NBA front offices during the 2020 offseason. He was selected in the second round of the 2020 NBA draft with the 31st pick by the Dallas Mavericks. He was signed on December 1, 2020. Terry was assigned to the Memphis Hustle of the NBA G League for the start of the G League season, making his debut for the Hustle on February 10, 2021.

On October 15, 2021, Terry was waived by the Mavericks.

On December 25, 2021, Terry signed a 10-day contract with the Memphis Grizzlies, via the hardship exemption. On January 1, 2022, he was signed to a two-way contract. On July 2, Terry was waived by the Grizzlies.

In December 2022, Terry announced his retirement from professional basketball, citing mental health reasons.

National team career
In 2018, Terry played for the United States national team at the Albert Schweitzer Tournament, a U18 tournament in Mannheim, Germany. In five games, he averaged 6.6 points, 2.6 assists and 1.8 steals per game and helped his team finish in seventh place in the tournament.

Career statistics

NBA

Regular season

|-
| style="text-align:left;"| 
| style="text-align:left;"| Dallas
| 11 || 0 || 5.1 || .313 || .000 || .333 || .5 || .5 || .5 || .0 || 1.0
|-
| style="text-align:left;"| 
| style="text-align:left;"| Memphis
| 2 || 0 || 1.5 || 1.000 ||  ||  || .0 || .0 || .0 || .0 || 1.0
|- class="sortbottom"
| style="text-align:center;" colspan="2"| Career
| 13 || 0 || 4.5 || .353 || .000 || .333 || .5 || .5 || .4 || .0 || 1.0

College

|-
| style="text-align:left;"| 2019–20
| style="text-align:left;"| Stanford
| 31 || 31 || 32.6 || .441 || .408 || .891 || 4.5 || 3.2 || 1.4 || .1 || 14.6

References

External links

Stanford Cardinal bio

2000 births
Living people
American men's basketball players
Basketball players from Minneapolis
Dallas Mavericks draft picks
Dallas Mavericks players
DeLaSalle High School (Minneapolis) alumni
Memphis Grizzlies players
Memphis Hustle players
Point guards
Stanford Cardinal men's basketball players
Basketball players from North Dakota
People from Valley City, North Dakota